The Boomi River, an anabranch of the Barwon River and part of the Macintyre catchment within the Murray–Darling basin, is located in the north–western slopes region of New South Wales, flowing downstream into the South Downs region of Queensland, Australia.

Course and features
The river descends  over its  course.

The Boomi River flows past, but not through, the town of Mungindi.

References

External links
 

Rivers of Queensland
South West Queensland
Tributaries of the Darling River
Darling Downs
North West Slopes